Coryell County is a county located on the Edwards Plateau in the U.S. state of Texas. As of the 2020 census, its population was 83,093.  The county seat is Gatesville. The county is named for James Coryell, a frontiersman and Texas Ranger who was killed by Caddo Indians.

Coryell County is part of the Killeen–Temple metropolitan statistical area.

History
Habitation of Coryell County dates as far back as 4500 BC. The Tonkawa, Lipan Apache, Kiowa, and Comanche were among the tribes who migrated through the area at various periods.
When the General Colonization Law went into effect in 1824, followed by the 1825 State Colonization Law of Coahuila y Tejas, Robert Leftwich obtained a grant to settle 800 families in Texas. The grant went through several legal challenges, and later became Robertson's Colony, named for Sterling C. Robertson. The grant encompassed all or parts of 30 present-day Texas counties. Settlers began moving into the area after Fort Gates was established at Gatesville. The Texas state legislature created the county in 1854, naming it after Texas Ranger James Coryell.  Originally, Coryell was to be named Pierce County, but the name was changed after James Coryell's death at the hands of Caddo indians.

Geography

Major highways
   Interstate 14/U.S. Highway 190
  U.S. Highway 84
  U.S. Highway 281
  State Highway 36

Adjacent counties
 Bosque County (north)
 McLennan County (northeast)
 Bell County (southeast)
 Lampasas County (southwest)
 Hamilton County (northwest)

Demographics

Note: the US Census treats Hispanic/Latino as an ethnic category. This table excludes Latinos from the racial categories and assigns them to a separate category. Hispanics/Latinos can be of any race.

As of the census of 2000,  74,978 people, 19,950 households, and 15,780 families were residing in the county.  The population density was 71 people per square mile (28/km2).  The 21,776 housing units  averaged 21 per sq mi (8/km2).  The racial makeup of the county was 65.28% White, 21.80% African American, 0.88% Native American, 1.75% Asian, 0.49% Pacific Islander, 6.26% from other races, and 3.54% from two or more races.  About 12.57% of the population were Hispanics or Latinos of any race.

Of the 19,950 households, 47.70% had children under the age of 18 living with them, 64.80% were married couples living together, 11.00% had a female householder with no husband present, and 20.90% were not families. About 16.90% of all households were made up of individuals, and 5.50% had someone living alone who was 65 years of age or older.  The average household size was 2.91, and the average family size was 3.27.

In the county, the age distribution was 26.20% under 18, 17.90% from 18 to 24, 36.30% from 25 to 44, 13.80% from 45 to 64, and 5.70% who were 65 or older.  The median age was 28 years. For every 100 females, there were 105.30 males.  For every 100 females age 18 and over, there were 106.20 males.

Males had a median income of $24,236 versus $21,186 for females. The per capita income for the county was $14,410. About 7.80% of families and 9.50% of the population were below the poverty line, including 12.30% of those under age 18 and 9.00% of those age 65 or over.

Government and infrastructure
Of the eight Texas Department of Criminal Justice general correctional facilities for women, which include five prisons and three state jails, five of the units, including four prisons and one state jail, are in the City of Gatesville.

The Christina Crain Unit prison (formerly Gatesville Unit),
the Hilltop Unit prison,
the Dr. Lane Murray Unit prison,
and the Linda Woodman Unit state jail are co-located among one another. In addition the Mountain View Unit, a prison with the State of Texas female death row, is in Gatesville. One male prison, the Alfred D. Hughes Unit, is in Gatesville.

Mountain View opened in July 1975, Crain opened in August 1980, Hilltop opened in November 1981, and Hughes opened in January 1990. Murray opened in November 1995, and Woodman opened in June 1997. In 1995, of the counties in Texas, Coryell had the third-highest number of state prisons and jails, after Walker and Brazoria.

Politics

Communities

Cities
 Copperas Cove (small parts in Lampasas and Bell Counties)
 Gatesville (county seat)
 McGregor (mostly in McLennan County)
 Oglesby

Towns
 Evant (partly in Hamilton County)
 South Mountain
 Turnersville

Census-designated place
 Fort Hood (partly in Bell County)

Unincorporated communities

 Bee House
 Bluestem Village
 Coryell City
 Flat
 Ireland
 Jonesboro (partly in Hamilton County)
 Levita
 Mound
 Osage
 Pancake
 Pearl
 Pidcoke
 Purmela
 The Grove

See also

 List of museums in Central Texas
 National Register of Historic Places listings in Coryell County, Texas
 Recorded Texas Historic Landmarks in Coryell County

References

External links
 Texas State Directory, County officials
 
 Coryell County in Handbook of Texas Online at the University of Texas
 Read James Coryell's entry in the Biographical Encyclopedia of Texas hosted by the Portal to Texas History.

 
1854 establishments in Texas
Killeen–Temple–Fort Hood metropolitan area
Texas Hill Country